Crombrugghia distans, also known as the Breckland plume is a moth of the family Pterophoridae found in Africa, Asia and Europe. It was first described by Philipp Christoph Zeller in 1847.

Description
Adults are on wing from April to June and again from July to September in two generations in western Europe. The moth is easily disturbed during the day, especially in hot weather, flies from dusk and occasionally comes to light. The scarce light plume (Crombrugghia laetus) is similar and examination of the genitalia is necessary if it is suspected to be this species.

The larvae feed on smooth hawksbeard (Crepis capillaris), narrow-leaved hawk's-beard (Crepis tectorum), Crepis succifolia, Crepis conyzaefolia, mouse-ear hawkweed (Hieracium pilosella), hawkweed oxtongue (Picris hieracioides), blue heliotrope (Heliotropium amplexicaule), perennial sow-thistle (Sonchus arvensis), prickly sow-thistle (Sonchus asper), Chicory (Cichorium intybus) and Cichorium albida. Larvae of the spring generation feed on the central parts of the plant, while the larvae of the summer generation feed on the flower buds.

Distribution
It is found in almost all of Europe, as well as Asia Minor, North Africa and the Canary Islands. It is also known from Afghanistan, India and Iran.

References

External links
 Microlepidoptera.nl

Oxyptilini
Moths described in 1847
Insects of the Canary Islands
Moths of Asia
Plume moths of Africa
Plume moths of Asia
Plume moths of Europe
Taxa named by Philipp Christoph Zeller